The Betty Engelstad Sioux Center (The Betty) is an indoor arena located in Grand Forks, North Dakota. It is adjacent to the larger $100 million Ralph Engelstad Arena in the University Village development. 

The facility sits on the campus of the University of North Dakota and is used for the university's basketball and volleyball teams.
The facility opened in August 2004. It has a seating capacity of 3,300. It features a  wood floor.  In addition to university sports, the arena is used for small concerts and other community events.

See also
List of NCAA Division I basketball arenas

References

External links

Basketball venues in North Dakota
College basketball venues in the United States
College volleyball venues in the United States
Sports venues in North Dakota
North Dakota Fighting Hawks basketball venues
Buildings and structures in Grand Forks, North Dakota
Indoor arenas in North Dakota
2004 establishments in North Dakota
Sports venues completed in 2004